Get Some In! is a British television sitcom about National Service life in the Royal Air Force, broadcast between 1975 and 1978 by Thames Television. Scripts were by John Esmonde and Bob Larbey, the team behind sitcoms such as The Good Life.

The programme drew its inspiration from late 1950s – early 1960s National Service situation-comedy The Army Game and from nostalgic BBC TV sitcom Dad's Army but the RAF setting gave it enough originality not to seem formulaic. Thirty-four (commercial) half-hour episodes were made.

The title is a contraction of "Get some service in!", which was a piece of Second World War-era military slang sometimes shouted by conscripted soldiers at civilians of conscription age whom the conscripts may have believed were avoiding call-up. By the 1960s the expression had a clear and self-evident sexual connotation which replaced the original meaning and resulted in a convenient double entendre for the programme.

The series has never been repeated in full on terrestrial TV in the UK, although the UKTV Gold cable channel has aired the episodes uncut. The whole series was shown on Forces TV (UK) in 2016 and again in 2019, and on Talking Pictures TV in 2019, 2021 and 2022. It was screened in Australia in the early 1980s.

Premise

The overarching concept follows a single hut of recruits at RAF Skelton in 1955. They are a group of social misfits of which, through default, Jakey Smith is the alpha male. Most stories concern their ongoing conflict with the sadistic corporal who runs the hut. The corporal lives in married quarters on site, and this female dimension gives an occasional sexual dimension to the plots.

Relocation in series 3 to RAF Midham next to a WAAF station allowed an additional sexual angle, as did Corporal Marsh moving into married quarters on-site (albeit a caravan). Marsh also decides to retrain and effectively becomes an equal rather than superior to the other boys as all train to be medics. Series 4 ends with the main group posted to Malta as medics.

Series 5 is effectively a hospital comedy, and whilst the characters are the same, the change of atmosphere and recasting of Jakey Smith impact heavily and detaches this series from the first four.

Characters

National Service recruits
 Ken Richardson. A former grammar school pupil, Ken is very well-mannered much to the disgust of Corporal Marsh. Due to his education, he often finds himself on the receiving end of insults from Corporal Marsh such as "poofhouse" and "Nance" (short for "Nancy Boy", i.e. homosexual). Far from being homosexual, Richardson falls quickly for the charms of Lilley's sister Agnes, and later for Mrs. Fairfax - an officer's wife. Richardson is kind to all the other national servicemen, despite exhibiting obvious differences from them. Played by David Janson.
 Jakey Smith, a former Teddy Boy from London. Jakey soon finds himself at odds with Corporal Marsh, and dislikes the whole concept of National Service. He has little or no respect for authority but is at heart a decent individual. Marsh delights in calling him "Edward VII", an allusion to his former Teddy Boy culture, though on leave Jakey finds himself no longer accepted amongst the Teds. Played by Robert Lindsay (Series 1–4) until Lindsay left to star in his own show Citizen Smith, and then by Karl Howman (Series 5).
 Matthew Lilley, a vicar's son who plays the harpsichord and is very well-mannered. Raised to be God-fearing, Lilley prides himself on not hating anybody - not even Marsh. Though naturally shy, Matthew is usually the first to object to Corporal Marsh's shady schemes. Marsh sometimes calls him "Holy Joe" or "Christopher Robin" - the latter an allusion to the poem Vespers by A.A. Milne (in which the first and final stanzas end with the line "Christopher Robin is saying his prayers"). In series 3 and 4 Lilley shows a phobia for blood and body parts which causes him to faint but nevertheless he scores high as a medic and passes the exam. Played by Gerard Ryder.
 Bruce Leckie. A Scotsman from Glasgow, Bruce has a very cynical view of life and is a pessimist. Cpl. Marsh called him "Jockstrap" and "Jock". Like Jakey, he does not like being conscripted for National Service. Bruce is very shy around women but eventually falls in love with and finds happiness with Corporal Wendy (Jenny Cryst), though this happiness is short-lived as after Bruce completes his trade training they are both posted to different RAF stations, but get married in series 4. Played by Brian Pettifer.

Officers and instructors
 Corporal Percy Marsh GM. Corporal, later Sergeant, later Corporal, later AC1, later Corporal, Marsh is a drill instructor who becomes the bane of the recruits' lives. A man with a sadistic sense of humour and few (if any) friends, he continually makes his charges' lives miserable. He has an eidetic memory and an eerie aptitude for mental arithmetic, which are sometimes mistaken for high intelligence, although he is actually quite stupid. (For instance, in his nursing attendant's examination he states that the function of the pancreas is to digest carrots.) Marsh always craves promotion but his own schemes usually backfire preventing him from attaining his goal. At the end of series 4 he is demoted for cheating in an exam, though he later regains his rank by faking an act of heroism (for which he also receives the George Medal). Played by Tony Selby.
 Squadron Leader Clive Baker. Medical Officer of RAF Skelton and later anatomy instructor at RAF Midham. Played by John D. Collins.
 Flight Lieutenant Roland Grant. Officer commanding C Flight and Marsh's superior at Skelton. He dislikes Marsh's bullying but his public school code of conduct prevents him from doing much about it; when forced to exert his authority he generally sides with Marsh. Played by David Quilter.
 Group-Captain Ruark. Played by Nigel Pegram.
 The Padre. A mild-mannered priest who caters for the recruits' spiritual needs - though only Lilley ever has much to do with him. Played by Tim Barrett.

Other characters
 Alice Marsh.  Corporal Marsh's wife. She is constantly irritated by her husband's lack of advancement in the RAF, but she is a kind-hearted woman and is good to the recruits, much to the irritation of Marsh. She left him during the fourth series, only to return in the end. Played by Lori Wells.
 Mrs Fairfax. Wife of one of the senior officers, a beautiful and compassionate lady who despises Marsh and is kind to recruits. Richardson develops a crush on her in Series 2. Played by Angela Thorne.
 Corporal Wendy. A WRAF corporal, married in the fourth series to Bruce Leckie. Played by Jenny Cryst (a.k.a. Jenny Clarke) married name Jenny Grant wife of Keith Grant (Olympic Studios) Barnes, London

Theme song
The theme song composed by Alan Braden, quickly communicated to audiences that national service would not be a fulfilling experience for the recruits with the lines "Though you're in the RAF, you'll never see a plane" and "There's only one way to get out and that's to get some in. Get Some In!"

Episodes

Series 1 (1975)

Special (1975)

Series 2 (1976)

Series 3 (1977)
{{Episode table |background=B1151A
|overall=4
|title=19
|director=15 |directorT=Produced & Directed by
|airdate=15
|episodes=
{{episode list
|EpisodeNumber=16
|Title=Erks
|DirectedBy=Michael Mills
|OriginalAirDate=
|ShortSummary= Flt Lt Grant wants C Flight to win the Inter-Flight Competition but feels that Marsh does not have the respect of the men in his command. He bribes Marsh with sergeant stripes if Marsh can deliver on the trophy. The lads are suspicious when Marsh lets slip that Grant is dying. Marsh throws his weight about in the Sergeant’s Mess but is soon put in his place by the other sergeants. To make matters worse, a careless moment in the hut spells disaster.
With Don Henderson as Flt Sgt Tidy, David Sibley as LAC Steward and Keith Ashley as Sergeant.
Erk refers to the lowest ranks of the RAF|LineColor=B1151A
}}

}}

Series 4 (1977)

Series 5 (1978)

Stage show
A stage version of Get Some In! was produced for a 1977 summer season at the Princess Theatre, Torquay.

 Setting and filming locations 
Series 1–2 were set at the fictional Royal Air Force station RAF Skelton. They were filmed at Hobbs Barracks near Felbridge in Surrey. The barracks are, as of 2017, an industrial estate.

At the beginning of the third series, the recruits' barracks hut is destroyed by fire and so in series 3–4 events were set at fictional RAF Midham. Series 5 was set at fictional RAF hospital Druidswater which was filmed at RAF Halton, the very first scene was filmed outside the old Guard room.

The Christmas special (broadcast between Series 1 and 2), set at RAF Skelton, was captioned "Christmas 1955", but the remainder of the series (involving two changes of camp) continued to be set in 1955.

Home release
All five series including a 5-DVD set of the complete series of Get Some In!'' have been released by Network.

References

External links
 
 Get Some In! at British TV Comedy
 Get Some In! episode guide on ComedySeries.info

1975 British television series debuts
1978 British television series endings
1970s British sitcoms
Aviation television series
British military television series
English-language television shows
ITV sitcoms
Military comedy television series
Royal Air Force mass media
Television shows produced by Thames Television
Television series by Fremantle (company)